Zhangixalus yaoshanensis is a species of frog in the family Rhacophoridae. It is endemic to China, where its type locality is Dayao Mountain, Jinxiu County, Guangxi Province.

Its natural habitats are subtropical or tropical moist lowland forests and subtropical or tropical moist montane forests.

It is threatened by habitat loss.

References

yaoshanensis
Amphibians of China
Endemic fauna of China
Taxonomy articles created by Polbot
Amphibians described in 1962